Lukáš Jašek  (born 28 August 1997) is a Czech professional ice hockey forward who is currently playing under contract to Lahti Pelicans of the Finnish Liiga.

Playing career
Jašek made his Czech Extraliga (ELH) professional debut playing with HC Oceláři Třinec during the 2014–15 Czech Extraliga season. He was selected in the sixth round, 174th overall, by the Vancouver Canucks in the 2015 NHL Entry Draft.

On 20 April 2018, Jašek signed a three-year, entry-level contract with the Vancouver Canucks of the NHL. He was assigned to the Canucks AHL affiliate, the Utica Comets for the remainder of the 2017–18 season.

On 24 August 2020, Jašek was assigned by the Vancouver Canucks to original club, HC Oceláři Třinec of the Czech Extraliga, on loan until the commencement of the delayed 2020–21 North American season.

As an impending restricted free agent, having been unable to make the NHL, Jašek left the Canucks organization in agreeing to a one-year contract with Finnish club, Lahti Pelicans of the Liiga, on 12 June 2021.

Career statistics

Regular season and playoffs

International

References

External links
 

1997 births
Living people
Czech ice hockey right wingers
AZ Havířov players
HC Bílí Tygři Liberec players
HC Frýdek-Místek players
HC Oceláři Třinec players
Utica Comets players
Vancouver Canucks draft picks
Sportspeople from Třinec
Czech expatriate ice hockey players in Sweden
Czech expatriate ice hockey players in Finland
Czech expatriate ice hockey players in the United States